Randall Herman Meisner (born March 8, 1946) is a retired American musician, singer, songwriter and founding member of the Eagles. Throughout his professional musical career, Meisner's main role was that of bassist and backing high-harmony vocalist as both a group member and session musician. He co-wrote the Eagles hit song "Take It to the Limit", which he also sang.

Early life
Randall Herman Meisner was born in Scottsbluff, Nebraska, the second child and only son of farmers Herman (1911–1995) and Emilie (née Haun) Meisner (1911–2010). All four of his grandparents were Volga German immigrants. Randy had an older sister,  Carol, who died in 2005. He recalled that his mother was always singing around the house. His maternal grandfather, George Haun, was a violin teacher.

The Meisner family grew corn, beans, alfalfa, and sugar beets on their farm. Young Randy developed an interest in the guitar at ten years old, after seeing Elvis Presley perform on the Ed Sullivan Show. He began taking lessons and playing in local bands. While attending Scottsbluff High School, one of Randy's teachers suggested he take up the bass. "I loved R&B and the bass players on the Motown stuff were great. They really inspired me. I can't read music. Once I learn a part it's there. My bass playing came real naturally."

Career

Early career (1961–1968) 
Meisner played bass and sang with a local band named The Dynamics (later The Drivin' Dynamics) from 1961 to 1965. Their first paying job was in the dance hall at Little Moon Lake, in Torrington, Wyoming in December 1961. They played there regularly through 1962. In late 1962, The Drivin' Dynamics released their first record, a 4-song EP with Meisner singing lead vocals on Sam Cooke's "You Send Me." It was pressed locally with only 500 copies released. In August 1965, The Dynamics signed a record deal with Sully Records out of Amarillo, Texas. They recorded three songs, with Meisner singing lead on two: "One Of These Days" and "So Fine". "So Fine" was released as a single and sold well regionally and in the southeastern U.S.
Early in 1966,

Meisner moved to California with a band named The Soul Survivors, later to be renamed The Poor (because, as Don Felder later said, "that is what they became"). It was a hardscrabble existence, as Meisner later recalled, "I never had a car, I had to walk. I sold the Los Angeles Free Press on Sunset and Highland. I made about five bucks a day." The Poor was managed by Charlie Greene and Brian Stone, who also managed Buffalo Springfield and Sonny & Cher. The band released several singles on Loma, York and Decca Records in 1966 and 1967, with limited success. Loma Records was a subsidiary of Warner Bros., and had offices in the same building. In February 1967, The Poor recorded "She's Got the Time, She's Got the Changes," written by Tom Shipley (later of Brewer & Shipley fame) while he was a staff writer for A&M Records. Three of the singles were produced by Barry Friedman (aka "Frazier Mohawk") and recorded at Gold Star Studios. The band performed on "Study in Motion #1" which was featured in the 1967 Jack Nicholson film Hell's Angels on Wheels.

In the summer of 1967, The Poor was booked for two weeks at the Salvation Club in New York City, opening for The Jimi Hendrix Experience. Though they did get to play a few times, it was not the opportunity they had hoped it would be, and the band members had to threaten management to get money for plane tickets back to L.A. Rev-Ola released a CD of The Poor's music in 2003, which included one song written by Meisner called "Come Back Baby."

Poco and the Stone Canyon Band (1968–1970) 
In May 1968, after auditioning alongside Gregg Allman and Timothy B. Schmit, Meisner joined Poco (originally named Pogo) with former Buffalo Springfield members Richie Furay and Jim Messina. Meisner appears on the group's first album, Pickin' Up the Pieces, but quit the band shortly before the record was released. His exit was the result of his anger at being excluded from participation in the final mix playback sessions for the album, as only Messina and Furay were to complete production. His image was removed from the painting on the album's cover and replaced with a dog. His bass parts and backing vocals were left in the final mix, but his lead vocals were removed, and new versions were sung by George Grantham.

In April 1969, Meisner joined Rick Nelson's Stone Canyon Band, and persuaded Nelson and producer John Boylan to hire his former bandmates from The Poor, Allen Kemp (guitar) and Pat Shanahan (drums); pedal steel guitarist Tom Brumley, previously of Buck Owens' band, completed the group. Meisner appears on both In Concert at the Troubadour, 1969 and Rudy The Fifth. He is also featured in Easy to Be Free, a documentary of the Stone Canyon Band's 1969 tour, directed by Rick Nelson's brother David. The film was eventually broadcast on American television in 1973. Meisner co-produced "In Concert at the Troubadour" with Rick Nelson. Although he did not perform on Nelson's Garden Party, he did co-author one of the album's tracks, "I Wanna Be With You." Meisner continued to support himself as a session performer, playing bass on two tracks of James Taylor's Sweet Baby James album ("Country Road" and "Blossom"), recorded in December 1969. That same month, he played bass on several tracks for Waylon Jennings' 1970 album "Singer of Sad Songs," recorded in RCA Victor Studio, Hollywood.

Meisner returned to Nebraska in the spring of 1970, after a difficult tour of Europe with Rick Nelson and the Stone Canyon Band. He began working at Frank Implement Company, the local John Deere tractor dealership. At night, he played in a band called Goldrush that featured Stephen A. Love (later to become a member of New Riders of the Purple Sage). Later that year, with Rick Nelson's encouragement, he returned to Los Angeles to resume his career. He worked to establish Goldrush, while also playing in the Stone Canyon Band and playing on sessions for John Stewart and Compton & Batteau. By mid-1971, he was recruited by John Boylan to become active in Linda Ronstadt's roster of backing musicians, which included Don Henley, Glenn Frey and Bernie Leadon, who later joined Meisner as the founding members of the Eagles.

Eagles (1971–1977)
In September 1971, Meisner, along with Don Henley, Glenn Frey and Bernie Leadon, formed the Eagles, signing with David Geffen's new label, Asylum Records, and they released their eponymous debut album in 1972. While he usually played the bass and handled backing vocals for the Eagles, he wrote, co-wrote, and/or sang lead on songs on each of the group's first five albums, most notably "Take It to the Limit," the band's first million-selling single, and the 3rd song released from One of These Nights. Other songs he wrote and sang lead on include "Try and Love Again", "Is it True?", "Take the Devil", "Tryin'" and he also wrote the song "Certain Kind of Fool" with Frey and Henley, which also had him singing lead.

According to band colleague Don Felder, Meisner's time in the band was weighed down by his desire to be with his family, as well as the constant bickering between the members, which was still unknown to the public at the time. During the 1976/77 tour in support of the album Hotel California, Meisner was plagued by ill health and exhaustion, as the band toured frequently for over eleven months. Meisner also preferred not to be the center of attention, and said: "I was always kind of shy ... They wanted me to stand in the middle of the stage to sing 'Take It to the Limit,' but I liked to be out of the spotlight." The band was starting to feel the strain in a long tour, and Meisner was unhappy – his stomach ulcers had flared up, and his marriage was also gradually disintegrating. He had been arguing with fellow member Glenn Frey about his signature song, "Take It To the Limit", during the tour, as Meisner was struggling to hit the crucial high notes in the song. At their show in Knoxville, Tennessee, Meisner decided to skip the song as an encore as he had stayed up late and caught the flu, and Frey and Meisner then became involved in an angry physical confrontation backstage. After the altercation, Meisner was frozen out from the band, and Meisner later said: "That was the end. . . I really felt like I was a member of the group, not a part of it." Meisner decided to leave the group after the final date of the tour and returned to Nebraska to be with his family. His last performance was in East Troy, Wisconsin on September 3, 1977. The band replaced Meisner with the same musician who had succeeded him in Poco, Timothy B. Schmit, after agreeing that Schmit was the only candidate.

Meisner formally quit the band in September 1977, citing "exhaustion". On the subject of his abrupt resignation from the band, Meisner later said, "All that stuff and all the arguing amongst the Eagles is over now. Well at least for me."

Post-Eagles (1978 onwards) 
Following his departure from the Eagles, Meisner went on to release solo albums in 1978 (Randy Meisner) and 1980 (One More Song). He has said that his 1978 album, which he co-produced with Alan Brackett, was scattershot and not "conceptualized to its best." It only featured one song co-written by Meisner, a new arrangement of "Take It to the Limit" and he only played bass on one song, a cover of The Drifters' "Save the Last Dance for Me". He explains that "Elektra had a 'leaving members clause' and I had to record an album for them before I was able to do what I wanted." 1980's One More Song was produced by Val Garay and featured backing vocals by his former Eagles bandmates Don Henley and Glenn Frey on the Jack Tempchin-composed title track. Meisner co-wrote six of the album's nine songs, including the Top 20 single "Hearts on Fire," collaborating with songwriters Wendy Waldman and Eric Kaz.

He toured with his band, Randy Meisner & the Silverados, throughout the early 1980s. The 1981 band included Greg Palmer on bass, Todd Smith on guitar, Sterling Smith on keyboards, Don Francisco (not the Christian singer of the same name) on percussion and background vocals, and Therese Heston on background vocals. In 1982, he released another album on CBS (Randy Meisner), recorded at Kendun Recorders in Burbank, California and produced by Mike Flicker, best known for his work with Heart. Several members of Heart, including the Wilson sisters, played and/or sang on the Randy Meisner album. The revamped Silverados included Dixon House on keyboards, Denny Carmassi on drums, Tom Erak on bass, and John Corey on guitar, as well as Sterling Smith from the earlier band. The album featured a Top 20 hit "Never Been in Love," composed by Craig Bickhardt.

In 1985, Meisner became part of an all-star band Black Tie composed of Jimmy Griffin (of Bread) and Billy Swan. Black Tie's cover of Buddy Holly's "Learning the Game" became a hit on U.S. country radio.  Respected session musician Blondie Chaplin and former Eagles member Bernie Leadon joined the band on their U.S. tour in early 1986. The band released one album together in 1990, When the Night Falls. Jimmy Griffin departed and was replaced by Charlie Rich, Jr. The band was renamed Meisner, Rich & Swan. Alternatively known as Meisner, Swan & Rich, the trio toured extensively in the 1990s and recorded an album. Unfortunately, the album was released on September 11, 2001, and failed to garner much attention at the time.

From 1987 to 1989, Meisner formed a band and toured with former Firefall singer-songwriter Rick Roberts, called the Roberts-Meisner Band (Roberts had previously been a Burrito Brother with Bernie Leadon, notably on 1971's The Flying Burrito Brothers). The Roberts-Meisner Band's drummer was well-known musician Ron Grinel, who also played with Dan Fogelberg, Carole King and the Souther-Hillman-Furay Band. Also in the band were Bray Ghiglia on guitar, flute, saxophone, and keyboards, and Cary Park on lead guitar. Roberts reports that the band recorded "at least half a dozen" songs, but that record company interest was not as great as they had expected.

In 1989 and 1990, Meisner reunited with Poco for the Legacy album and tour. "Call It Love" was a Top 20 single in the U.S. Meisner sang lead on the Richard Marx-composed "Nothin' to Hide," which also sold well for the band.

Meisner expressed disappointment and hurt at being excluded from the Eagles' 1994 "resumption" tour Hell Freezes Over. In an interview with the television program American Journal, Meisner said he had contacted the band's manager, Irving Azoff, when he heard rumors of the band reforming but was brushed off by him. "You'd think that you would be mentioned if you helped with six of the albums, but they act as though I never even played with them," Meisner said at the time. Meisner also asked the band if he could sit in with them at their Millennium Concert at the Staples Center in Los Angeles on New Year's Eve 1999, but says he was rebuffed; however, he says he holds no resentment towards Henley and Frey.

The Eagles' 1998 appearance at the New York City induction ceremony for the Rock and Roll Hall of Fame featured all seven past and present members of the Eagles. They performed "Take It Easy" and "Hotel California". His successor Timothy B. Schmit paid tribute to Meisner in his acceptance speech.

Meisner reunited with the Drivin' Dynamics for a performance in 2000, when the band and Meisner as a solo performer was inducted into the Nebraska Music Hall of Fame. In the 2000s he performed as a part of the World Classic Rockers touring group. After suffering severe chest pains and being hospitalized in August 2004, Meisner cut back on his touring schedule. His last known public performance was in 2008 in Naples, Florida.

Meisner was invited by the Eagles to take part in their History of the Eagles world tour in 2013, but he declined due to health issues. In September 2018, during the Eagles North American Leg he was acknowledged for showing up to a concert at The Forum in Inglewood, California. The three-night stand was released as Live from the Forum MMXVIII.

Personal life
Meisner has been married twice. He married his high-school girlfriend, Jennifer Lee Barton, in 1963, and the young couple had a son, Dana Scott Meisner in November 1963. The couple had two more children, twins Heather Leigh and Eric Shane Meisner, born in May 1970, before divorcing in 1981.

He later married his girlfriend of twelve years, Lana Rae, in November 1996. The marriage lasted until her death in 2016.

Many people who have met and worked with Meisner remark on his kindness. Don Felder, James Taylor, and Rick Roberts have described Meisner as one of the nicest people they have ever worked with. Felder adds, "He was a wonderful Midwestern guy with a great heart and a loving soul." Henry Diltz, who photographed Meisner extensively with the Eagles and in the early 1980s during Meisner's solo career, says, "Randy Meisner was a very gentle soul. Pisces. A quiet and friendly guy. No aggressive vibe at all. Very sweet. He was so there and open." His shyness has also been remarked upon, and may have caused him some difficulty as a performer at times. "Randy was extremely uncomfortable with so-called superstardom," Don Henley told author Marc Eliot.

Impostor case
In 1988, a man named Lewis Peter "Buddy" Morgan started impersonating Meisner. He had previously been charged with impersonating Don Henley in Las Vegas, Nevada, but he skipped on his bail. Morgan's identity was not conclusively revealed until 1997. In 1998, Morgan was again arrested, and spent 16 months in prison. Upon his release, Morgan continued his charade, and was still doing so as of 2009. In Reno, Nevada, he often tried to use Meisner's identity to rent hotel rooms. He was not as successful as years earlier with the ruse, since the city's hotels had notified each other of the impostor. Some people are not familiar with Meisner's appearance, and Morgan used that fact to con musical instrument manufacturers and retailers, casino owners and women.

Health and legal issues 
Meisner has reportedly struggled with periodic alcohol dependence since the late 1960s, especially during his tenure with the Eagles, as he tried to deal with his new-found fame.[not in citation given] Following minor heart attacks in 2004, he was forced to cut back on touring. As his health continued to deteriorate, he eventually stopped performing. His last-known public performance was in 2008 in Naples, Florida.

In March 2013, Meisner suffered yet another health scare after losing consciousness in his California home. A piece of food obstructed his breathing while he was eating, and he was rushed to the hospital. While doctors were optimistic about his recovery, Meisner spent some time in a coma, and in his weakened state was unable to participate in the History of the Eagles tour alongside fellow ex-bandmate Bernie Leadon, who participated in the tour. He later revealed that his former Eagles bandmates had paid the medical bills from the hospitalization.

In April 2015, Meisner and his wife denied rumors, based on a lawsuit filed on his behalf, that she was taking advantage of his known addictions to alcohol and drugs by trying to force-feed him bottles of vodka to keep him drunk. The singer's self-described longtime friend, James Newton, filed papers in April asking that Meisner be placed under a court-supervised conservatorship governing his personal and financial matters. Despite this, three months later, the Los Angeles County Superior Court appointed a temporary conservator to oversee the 24-hour management of Meisner's drug prescriptions and medical state, noting he was previously diagnosed as bipolar. Meisner had allegedly threatened to kill himself and others with a weapon in early 2015, though he did not have a firearm at the time. The brief conservatorship directed Meisner's medical care, but the judge did not give the conservator the additional power sought by Troy Martin and James Newton to also have her oversee his finances.

Death of Lana Meisner
On March 6, 2016, police responded to a 911 call made by a woman from the couple's Studio City, California house asking for police assistance for a possibly intoxicated male suspect. Ninety minutes later, after police had left the scene, Lana Meisner accidentally shot and killed herself when a rifle she was moving was struck by an object in its case and fired. Authorities determined that Meisner had no role in the shooting, as surveillance tapes showed he was in another part of the house at the time.

Following the accidental shooting, Meisner was placed under psychiatric hold after threatening suicide, due to previous threats and mental issues.

Recent appearances
Meisner was a special guest at two Richie Furay livestream concerts. On August 27, 2020. Meisner appeared (via video) from his home, singing back-up harmony with Furay and his band on the Buffalo Springfield song "For What It's Worth".

On October 30, 2020, Meisner made a second remote appearance, singing background vocals with Richie's band on the Poco song "Pickin' Up the Pieces". He was a special guest on the November 28, 2020 "Joe Walsh's Old Fashioned Rock n' Roll Radio Show", chatting with his friend and former Eagles bandmate Joe Walsh on the Independent 88.5FM.

Discography
See also Eagles discography and Poco discography for Meisner's work with these bands.

Albums 
{| class="wikitable" style="text-align:center;"
|-
! rowspan="2"| Year
! rowspan="2"| Album
! colspan="4"| Peak chart positions
|- style="font-size:smaller;"
! style="width:45px;"| US
! style="width:45px;"| US <br/ >Country
! style="width:45px;"| AUS
! style="width:45px;"| CAN
|-
| 1978
|style="text-align:left;" |Randy Meisner
| — || 7 || 90 || 2
|-
| 1980
| style="text-align:left;" |One More Song
| 50 || — || 83 || 44 
|-
| 1982
| style="text-align:left;" |Randy Meisner 
| 94 || 15 || — || 12
|-
| 1991
|style="text-align:left;" |When the Night Falls (with Black Tie)
| — || 65 || —  || —
|-
| 2001
| style="text-align:left;" |Meisner, Swan & Rich <small>(as Meisner, Swan & Rich)</small>
| — || — || — || —
|-
| 2002
| style="text-align:left;" |Dallas 
| — || — || — || —
|-
| 2005
| style="text-align:left;" |Love Me or Leave Me Alone| — || — || — || —
|-
| colspan="14" style="text-align:center; font-size:90%;"|"—" denotes releases that did not chart.
|}

Singles

 Songs featuring Meisner 

 Eagles songs written or co-written by Meisner 
"Take the Devil" from Eagles"Early Bird" (co-written with Bernie Leadon) from Eagles"Tryin'" from Eagles"Certain Kind of Fool" from Desperado (co-written with Glenn Frey & Don Henley)
"Saturday Night" from Desperado (co-written with Frey/Henley/Leadon)
"Is It True" from On the Border"Too Many Hands" from One of These Nights (co-written with Don Felder)
"Take It to the Limit" from One of These Nights (co-written with Frey/Henley)
"Try and Love Again" from Hotel California Eagles songs featuring Meisner on lead or co-lead vocal 
"Most of Us Are Sad" from Eagles"Take the Devil" from Eagles"Tryin'" from Eagles"Certain Kind of Fool" from Desperado"Saturday Night" – lead vocal in the bridge ("She said tell me, oh tell me...") from Desperado"Midnight Flyer" from On the Border"On the Border" – lead vocal in the bridge ("Never mind your name...") from On the Border"Is It True" from On the Border"Too Many Hands" from One of These Nights"Take It to the Limit" from One of These Nights"Try and Love Again" from Hotel California Poco songs featuring Meisner on lead or co-lead vocal 
"Make Me a Smile" – high-harmony with Richie Furay from Pickin' Up the Pieces (written by Richie Furay/Jim Messina)
"Short Changed" – high-harmony with Richie Furay from Pickin' Up the Pieces (written by Richie Furay)
"Nothin' To Hide" from Legacy (written by Richard Marx, Bruce Gaitsch)
"Rough Edges" from Legacy (written by Young, Radney Foster, Bill Lloyd)
"Nature of Love" from Legacy (written by Jeff Silbar, Van Stephenson)

 Songs by other artists featuring Meisner on bass 
"Honeysuckle" and "Homesick Kid" by Compton & Batteau, on the In California album released in 1970
"Blossom" and "Country Road" by James Taylor, on the Sweet Baby James album, released 1970

See also

List of people with bipolar disorder

References
Eliot, Marc. To the Limit: The Untold Story of the Eagles. Da Capo Press, 2004. 

Kubernik, Harvey. "Canyon of Dreams". Sterling, 2009. 
McMullan, Jim with Gautier, Dick. Musicians as Artists''. Journey Editions, 1994.

Notes

External links

1946 births
Living people
American acoustic guitarists
American country rock musicians
American country bass guitarists
American male bass guitarists
American session musicians
American people of German descent
American people of German-Russian descent
American rock bass guitarists
American rock guitarists
American rock singers
Eagles (band) members
American male singer-songwriters
Grammy Award winners
Singer-songwriters from California
People from Scottsbluff, Nebraska
Poco members
Mexican-guitarron players
People from Studio City, Los Angeles
People with bipolar disorder
20th-century American bass guitarists
Guitarists from California
Guitarists from Nebraska
Asylum Records artists
Black Tie (band) members
Singer-songwriters from Nebraska
World Classic Rockers members